The Tragic Week of 1920 was a civil uprising that took place in Guatemala in the week of April 8 to April 14, 1920, led by Unionist Party leaders, student leaders and those who opposed President Manuel Estrada Cabrera when the latter refused to leave office after the National Assembly declared him mentally incompetent for the presidency and named Carlos Herrera as interim president.

Background

Unionists Party 

Several attacks had been made on president Manuel Estrada Cabrera's life, but fortune had always favored him. Even though he was a civilian, he based his power entirely on the support of the military. By declaring war on Germany during the First World War, he concocted a reason to increase his already well-equipped artillery by the addition of modern field guns, machine guns and ammunition.

Opposition to his regime started after the 1917-1918 earthquakes, as it was evident that the President was incapable of leading recovery efforts. Urged by his cousin, Manuel Cobos Batres, the Bishop of Facelli, Piñol y Batres from the Aycinena family, began preaching against government policies in the San Francisco Church in 1919. For the first time, the Catholic Church opposed the President. Additionally, Cobos Batres was able to inspire the national sentiment of conservative criollo leaders José Azmitia, Tácito Molina, Eduardo Camacho, Emilio Escamilla, and also Julio Bianchi, into forming a Central American Unionist party and opposing the strong-arm regime of Estrada Cabrera. The Unionist party began its activities with the support of several sectors of Guatemala City society, among them the Universidad Estrada Cabrera students and the labor associations, who under the leadership of Silverio Ortiz founded the Patriotic Labor Committee.

The new party was called "Unionist", to differentiate it from both the Liberal and Conservative parties and therefore be able to appeal to all "good willing, freedom and democracy loving" men who "dreamed of the Central American Union". The headquarters of the new party were in a house belonging to the Escamilla family which soon was known as "People's House". Tácito Molina wrote a founding declaration for the party, which was signed by fifty one citizens on 25 December 1919 and was later known as the "Three-fold Act" because it had to be folded in three when it was distributed to the citizens of the city. The document was distributed in Guatemala City until January 1, 1920.

March 11, 1920 

Estrada Cabrera was forced to accept the new party due to internal and international pressure. On March 1, 1920, the National Assembly officially accepted the new party. Since then, Estrada Cabrera publicly admitted his willingness to bow to international opinion on opening spaces for political rivals, but kept arresting Unionist sympathizers.

Ever since January, the Unionists had been taking a more threatening attitude - openly challenging the Government; they had also been harassed and imprisoned, but they were treated with less severity than had been previous challengers. It was whispered, however, that if necessary, the whole country would side with the Unionists.

On 11 March 1920, the new party organized a large demonstration against the government, demanding a new government, revision of the laws, administrative reforms, political freedom, and the abolition of press censorship.  The National Assembly leaders promised to receive them, but when the procession - numbering several thousand - arrived at the Military Academy, where the National Assembly had moved after the 1917-18 earthquakes, the army fired their machine guns against it, leaving scores of dead and wounded on the ground. This caused a lot of resentment and anger and united the Guatemalan people against the President, who was already detested after two decades of strong-armed rule and, in particular, for his egregious incompetence in leading the mrecovery after the 1917-18 earthquakes.

April 8, 1920 

Prince Wilhelm and his companions returned to Guatemala City on April 8, 1920, and he wrote in his book that "there was a sort of feeling in the air as though something was about to happen". The prince had no way to know that in the previous days Unionist leaders Julio Bianchi and Tácito Molina, among others, had struck a deal with Congressional leaders - especially Adrian Vidaurre - that on this day, the National Assembly would declare the President unfit for his high office. Congress assembled in one of the city’s public buildings and requested that ten medical men should be deputized to go to "La Palma" and investigate; the ten departed willingly enough, but being perfectly aware that following instructions would have been a death sentence, they stopped at a nearby corner, waited for a few hours and returned to Congress with their decision: the president is most certainly insane.

Then, President of Congress, Adrián Vidaurre, former Secretary of War and up to that point one of the most important members of Cabrera's cabinet, declared the President insane and unable to continue. He designated Carlos Herrera as interim president.

Herrera, then a representative from his hometown Santa Lucía Cotzumalguapa, had been elected on account of his good repute, his distinguished personal qualities and his great wealth, on the assumption that it would have rendered him less likely to enrich himself at others' expense.

Soon, great masses of people were marching through the streets shouting and waving and congratulating one another. Cars and other vehicles packed with passengers drove back and forth. Some added the clatter of tin cans and braying of toy trumpets to the noise, while in government buildings and barracks the soldiers simply looked on.  Most of the soldiers had been bought off and had promised to remain neutral until the dust settled.

But Estrada Cabrera was not done yet; upon learning of his diagnosis, he simply said: "Loco, ¿eh? ¡Ya verán su loco!" -"Mad, huh? They will see their madman!"-.

Tragic week April 9–14, 1920

April 9, 1920 

Cabrera resisted this designation and settled for a fight from his residence in "La Palma", which was a large enclosed area with roads crossing both ways, without civilizing aspects such as a park or garden. There was a clutter of small buildings painted in the crudest of colors; each house appeared to have been built for a particular purpose: one was the dining room, another the kitchen, a writing room, and so on. The sun beat down on the barren compound, which had little open space, but had wonderful landscapes painted on the walls. At a little distance were thatched huts with a lone broad bench that servants and soldiers used as both a table and a bed.

On April 9, 1920, Guatemala City was awakened with machine-gun fire and shelling in every quarter of the city. In "La Palma" French field-howitzers and seventy-fives with anti-aircraft sights, quick firing guns and machine guns were drawn. Meanwhile, in Guatemala City streets were deserted and bloodshed commenced in earnest. The Unionists were caught off-guard: they were disorganized and they had almost no weapons, but they quickly remedied the situation: Government buildings were systematically plundered and they gathered arms and ammunition from the most unlikely places. They armed themselves with knives, machetes, saloon rifles, shotguns, axes and crowbars.  They enthusiastically raised barricades and dug trenches in the streets.

At first, friends as well as enemies were attacked, but after white badges bearing the name "Unionista" were distributed, the fire was more effective. A few hours later most men of the city were wearing that token in their hat, and there were even some that had a portrait of the new president on their chest.  On the government side, steady fire was maintained from "La Palma" and the two forts of San José and Matamoros. Cars with the Red Cross flag dashed incessantly, nurses rode the running boards, each with medical supplies in one hand and a machete stuck in her belt.

The combat left water lines and electric cables damaged, leaving the city in darkness from the first night on; telephone and telegraph were also out of order. Bullets whistled about and the wildest rumors were the only source of news. owing to modern weaponry, it was a revolution hard fought.

April 10–13, 1920 

During these days there was reason to fear that the Cabrerists might attempt to outflank the city and fall upon the revolutionaries from the rear, causing each to defend himself as best he could in the confusion; and several times a truce was proclaimed, only to be broken a few minutes later.  Prince Wilhelm and his companions remained at the Hotel, which thanks to its solid walls and corrugated iron roof, withstood the rain of rifle bullets and shrapnel. Earth from patio flower tubs was stuffed into sacks to build a bomb-proof shelter for women and children. Old tram-lines from the street outside were torn up and used to reinforce the roof. Finally, using debris from a nearby demolished building - destroyed by the 1917-18 earthquakes- the guests were arable to barricade the main entrance to the building.

The first couple of days, one ducked and ran as fast as one could across a street, but later one took things more calmly, and waited till the fire slackened. Plundering was rampant: A store across the street from where the Swedish prince was staying was ransacked. Finding the looters had left a Venezuelan flag, the prince Fashioned it into a crude Swedish flag that flew from a hotel window for the duration, notifying both sides that it was a foreign legation.

April 14, 1920 

Combat lasted until San José fort fell. When the fort’s hungry defenders were bought off, "La Palma" was indefensible. By the following afternoon, the revolutionaries were absolute masters of the situation.  The firing gradually ceased and Estrada Cabrera surrendered, along with the remainder of his forces, numbering about five thousand.

Aftermath 

when the fighting ended, the damage was not as widespread as initially thought, with San José and the Central Prison suffering most of it. Those buildings were near each other and the surrounding houses were peppered with bullets and the streets partly torn up.  The Infant's Asylum was hit by a shell, killing about thirty mothers and their newborns. 

In "La Palma", the former garrison marched out as prisoners of war.  All were well-nourished and relaxed and took their belongings on their backs. Meanwhile, Estrada Cabrera was transported to the Military Academy under diplomatic escort. Once evacuated, plundering commenced; officers looked the other way as the looting was beyond their control and everybody got all they could. In a few hours, every article of value had vanished; even sheets of roofing and bits of window hardware were wrenched off. The elegant landau that had belonged to the president was stolen, along with its purebred mules.

Matamoros fort lacked any strategic advantage. Rafael Carrera had it built in the "Candelaria Barrio" - practically within the city - solely because that was his birthplace. However, its walls, arranged in a star formation, had gun emplacements at every loop-hole, angle and tower; from little Colt machine guns to big 12 cm. Krupp guns from 1877. The defenders had fired every weapon and had left them all pointed towards the city. On the wall of the commandant's quarters hung a detailed artillery map of the city and, close by, Estrada Cabrera's last order - dated six days previously - for the establishment of an extra telephone line to "La Palma".  Six great cellars were piled high with heaps of ammunition and the powder kegs stood in long rows; a paper on a door leading to the smaller chambers proclaimed that there were four million rounds of machine gun ammunition.  There was also an abundant supply of flour, though the supply of meat had run out when the last mule was shot.

San José fort was in similar situation to that of Matamoros, except that the ammunition had been dispatched more recklessly; the ground was so littered with empty cases that it was difficult to walk.  Given the large ammunition at the ex-president's disposal, it was remarkable that he surrendered so soon; but the troops were unreliable, deserting in great numbers to the Unionists at every opportunity.  Several hundred went missing every night during the Tragic Week. Afterwards, those caught trying to escape were killed on the spot by their officers. The troops still fighting were weakened by hunger, not because of lack of supplies, but rather due to miserable management of the commissariat.

Several attempts were made to take the Military Academy by force and to lynch the former president, but they all were strongly repelled by the Unionist guards as the party leaders were determined to return to a democracy ruled by law as soon as possible. Even so, they failed to prevent an angry mob from lynching twelve Cabrerists with clubs and machetes in Central Square. zNor could they prevent arsonists from destroying the central railway station; thick, suffocating clouds of smoke poured over the city, literally obscuring the sun. Civic leadership regained control and three days later, Guatemala city had resumed its normal appearance. There was no victory celebration; citizens were busy rebuilding, treating the thousands wounded, and mourning the 800 killed.

Estrada Cabrera loyal adherents until the end 

Estrada Cabrera finally surrendered on April 14, 1920 along with his only loyal friend, Peruvian poet José Santos Chocano.

See also 

 Carlos Herrera
 Manuel Estrada Cabrera
 United Fruit Company

Notes and references

Notes

References

Bibliography

External links 

History of Guatemala
Manuel Estrada Cabrera
Conflicts in 1920